Sharmistha Mukherjee (born 30 October 1965) is an Indian Kathak dancer, choreographer and politician of the Indian National Congress.

Early life and education 

Born in West Bengal, Mukherjee grew up in Delhi and was educated at St. Stephen’s College, Delhi. Her father was Pranab Mukherjee, who was the 13th President of the Republic of India.

Dance career 

Mukherjee began formal dance training at age 12. Her teachers included Pandit Durgalal, Vidushi Uma Sharma and Rajendra Gangani. The Hindu called her performances "accomplished" and lauded her precise footwork.

Politics 

Sharmistha joined the INC in July 2014. Since then she has been actively participating in rallies organized by the party and working at the grass root level with the party workers in her area. She contested the Delhi Assembly election in February 2015 from the Greater Kailash constituency but lost, coming third with 6,102 votes after Saurabh Bharadwaj (AAP, 57,589 votes) and Rakesh Gullaiya (BJP, 43,006 votes).

References

Women in Delhi politics
Indian National Congress politicians from Delhi
21st-century Indian women politicians
21st-century Indian politicians
Dancers from Delhi
Kathak exponents
Indian female classical dancers
Performers of Indian classical dance
21st-century Indian women artists
Children of presidents of India
Women artists from Delhi
21st-century Indian dancers
1965 births
Living people